This article summarizes equations in the theory of electromagnetism.

Definitions

Here subscripts e and m are used to differ between electric and magnetic charges. The definitions for monopoles are of theoretical interest, although real magnetic dipoles can be described using pole strengths. There are two possible units for monopole strength, Wb (Weber) and A m (Ampere metre). Dimensional analysis shows that magnetic charges relate by qm(Wb) = μ0 qm(Am).

Initial quantities

Electric quantities

Contrary to the strong analogy between (classical) gravitation and electrostatics, there are no "centre of charge" or "centre of electrostatic attraction" analogues.

Electric transport

Electric fields

Magnetic quantities

Magnetic transport

Magnetic fields

Electric circuits

DC circuits, general definitions

AC circuits

Magnetic circuits

Electromagnetism

Electric fields

General Classical Equations

Magnetic fields and moments

General classical equations

Electric circuits and electronics

Below N = number of conductors or circuit components. Subcript net refers to the equivalent and resultant property value.

See also
Defining equation (physical chemistry)
Fresnel equations
List of equations in classical mechanics
List of equations in fluid mechanics
List of equations in gravitation
List of equations in nuclear and particle physics
List of equations in quantum mechanics
List of equations in wave theory
List of photonics equations
List of relativistic equations
SI electromagnetism units
Table of thermodynamic equations

Footnotes

Sources

Further reading

 
 
 
 

Physical quantities
SI units
Equations of physics
Electromagnetism